The Silver Slugger Award is awarded annually to the best offensive player at each position in both the American League (AL) and the National League (NL), as determined by the coaches and managers of Major League Baseball (MLB). These voters consider several offensive categories in selecting the winners, including batting average, slugging percentage, and on-base percentage, in addition to "coaches' and managers' general impressions of a player's overall offensive value". Managers and coaches are not permitted to vote for players on their own team. The Silver Slugger was first awarded in 1980 and is given by Hillerich & Bradsby, the manufacturer of Louisville Slugger bats. The award is a bat-shaped trophy, 3 feet (91 cm) tall, engraved with the names of each of the winners from the league and plated with sterling silver.

Among third basemen, Wade Boggs has won the most Silver Slugger Awards, winning eight times with the rival Boston Red Sox (six) and New York Yankees (two). In the National League, Mike Schmidt leads with six wins; Schmidt won the first five National League Silver Slugger Awards at third base from 1980, when he led the Philadelphia Phillies to the World Series, to 1984 before his streak was broken by Tim Wallach. Nolan Arenado collected four National League Silver Sluggers at third base with the Colorado Rockies from 2015 to 2018, and a fifth with the St. Louis Cardinals in 2022. Yankees third baseman Alex Rodriguez has won three American League Silver Sluggers at the position, and has ten wins in his career as he accumulated seven wins at shortstop with the Seattle Mariners and Texas Rangers. Two National League third basemen have also won three Silver Sluggers. Matt Williams won the award in 1990, 1993, and 1994, when he was on pace to tie Roger Maris' home run record of 61 before the players' strike; Vinny Castilla won three awards in four years for the Colorado Rockies (1995, 1997–1998). José Ramírez and Nolan Arenado are the most recent winners.

George Brett hit .390 for the Kansas City Royals in the award's inaugural season, the highest average by a third baseman in the Silver Slugger era. Miguel Cabrera holds the National League batting average record for a third baseman (.339 in 2006). However, overall leader Boggs accumulated five winning seasons with a higher batting average than Cabrera's record. Boggs holds the record for the highest on-base percentage in a third baseman's winning season, with .476 in 1988; Chipper Jones' National League record is .441, achieved in 1999. Brett also holds the record for highest slugging percentage (.664 in 1980), followed by National League record-holder Schmidt (.644 in 1981). Schmidt's 48 home runs are tied with Adrián Beltré for most in the National League during an award-winning season. Despite this, Rodriguez holds the Major League record, with 54 home runs in 2007. Rodriguez batted in 156 runs during the 2007 season; the National League record is held by Castilla (144 runs batted in during 1998).

Key

American League winners

National League winners

References

Inline citations

External links
Louisville Slugger - The Silver Slugger Award

Silver Slugger Award
Awards established in 1980